HD-26 may refer to:

 A D subminiature plug or socket with 26 pins in three rows, strictly DA-26.
 The Heinkel HD 26 seaplane